Thierry Laurent (born 13 September 1966) is a retired French cyclist. He competed in the team time trial at the 1988 Summer Olympics.

Major results

1987
2nd Essor Breton
1988
1st Tour de la Manche
1989
1st Circuit de la Sarthe
1st stage 1
1st stage 1 Grand Prix du Midi Libre
1st stage 5 Tour de l'Avenir
1990
1st stage 4 Tour de Bretagne
1991
1st stage 2A Route du Sud
3rd Grand Prix de Denain
4th Amstel Gold Race
1992
1st stage 5 Étoile de Bessèges
1st stage 3 Tour du Limousin
1993
3rd Grand Prix de Plouay
1995
3rd Grand Prix du Midi Libre
10th Critérium du Dauphiné
1996
1st stage 6 Tour de l'Ain
2nd Four Days of Dunkirk
1st stage 4 
2nd Châteauroux Classic

References

1966 births
Living people
French male cyclists
Olympic cyclists of France
Cyclists at the 1988 Summer Olympics
Sportspeople from Villefranche-sur-Saône
Cyclists from Auvergne-Rhône-Alpes